Gabrovica is a settlement near Črni Kal in the City Municipality of Koper in the Littoral region of Slovenia. It lies below the Črni Kal Viaduct.

Name
The name of the settlement was changed from Gabrovica to Gabrovica pri Črnem Kalu in 1953.

Church
The local church is dedicated to Saint Nicholas and belongs to the Parish of Osp.

References

External links
Gabrovica pri Črnem Kalu on Geopedia

Populated places in the City Municipality of Koper